was a Japanese composer and musician, best known for creating the soundtracks of many films by Shinya Tsukamoto and Takashi Miike. He also founded industrial music groups Der Eisenrost and Zeitlich Vergelter.

Soundtracks
Tetsuo: The Iron Man (1989)
Tetsuo II: Body Hammer (1992)
Tokyo Fist (1995)
Fudoh: The New Generation (1996)
Bullet Ballet (1998)
Gemini (1999)
Dead or Alive 2: Birds (2000)
A Snake of June (2002)
Vital (2004)
Haze (2005)
Nightmare Detective (2006)
Nightmare Detective 2 (2008)
Tetsuo: The Bullet Man (2010)
Kotoko (2011)
 Fires on the Plain (2014)

External links

1966 births
2017 deaths
Cyberpunk music
Japanese film score composers
Japanese male composers
Japanese male film score composers
Japanese male musicians